Roy Ruben Chandler (born September 14, 2002) is an American baseball pitcher for the Pittsburgh Pirates organization.

Amateur career
Chandler lives in Bogart, Georgia and attended North Oconee High School, where he was a member of the baseball and football teams. He started on the varsity basketball team during his freshman and sophomore years and was also a member of the golf team before focusing on football and baseball. Chandler was initially only recruited by college baseball programs and committed to play at the University of Georgia going into his junior year of high school after posting a 7–0 record with 55 strikeouts in  innings as a pitcher and batting .356 with 14 doubles and 25 RBIs the previous season.

During his junior football season, Chandler completed 167 of 220 passing attempts for 2,098 yards and 27 touchdowns while also rushing for 505 yards and four touchdowns. In baseball, he batted .435 with two home runs, five doubles and 16 RBIs and struck out 16 batters in seven innings pitched before the season was cut short due to the coronavirus pandemic. Later in the year, Chandler decommitted from Georgia and then committed to play both college football and baseball at Clemson. During the summer he gained 35 pounds and developed a slider after studying Vanderbilt pitcher Kumar Rocker. As a senior, Chandler was named the Region 8 4A Offensive Player of the Year after passing for 1,842 yards and 18 touchdowns while also rushing for 548 yards and six touchdowns. During his senior baseball season he was also established himself as one of the best two-way prospects in the 2021 Major League Baseball Draft. Chandler finished his senior baseball season with an 8–1 record and a 1.25 ERA with 96 strikeouts over  innings pitched and also batted .411 with 12 doubles, eight home runs, 35 RBIs, and 41 runs scored.

Professional career
Chandler was selected in the third round with the 72nd overall pick in the 2021 Major League Baseball draft by the Pittsburgh Pirates. He signed with Pittsburgh on July 21, 2021, for an over slot signing bonus of $3 million. After signing with the team Chandler was assigned to the Rookie-level Florida Complex League Pirates, where he played in 11 games as a shortstop and designated hitter and batted .167.

Chandler returned to the Florida Complex League Pirates after beginning the 2022 season in extended spring training. He was promoted to the Bradenton Marauders of the Single-A Florida State League. Chandler decided to give up playing shortstop and focus solely on pitching entering the 2023 season.

References

External links

2002 births
Baseball players from Georgia (U.S. state)
Baseball pitchers
Baseball shortstops
Living people
Florida Complex League Pirates players
Bradenton Marauders players